Daisuke Nishikawa (born 2 June 1970) is a retired Japanese gymnast who competed in the 1988 Summer Olympics and in the 1992 Summer Olympics.

References

1970 births
Living people
Japanese male artistic gymnasts
Olympic gymnasts of Japan
Gymnasts at the 1988 Summer Olympics
Gymnasts at the 1992 Summer Olympics
Olympic bronze medalists for Japan
Olympic medalists in gymnastics
Asian Games medalists in gymnastics
Gymnasts at the 1990 Asian Games
Gymnasts at the 1994 Asian Games
Asian Games silver medalists for Japan
Asian Games bronze medalists for Japan
Medalists at the 1990 Asian Games
Medalists at the 1994 Asian Games
Medalists at the 1992 Summer Olympics
Medalists at the 1988 Summer Olympics
Medalists at the World Artistic Gymnastics Championships
20th-century Japanese people
21st-century Japanese people